Vsevolod Sadovsky (born 4 October 1996) is a Belarusian professional footballer who plays for Ordabasy.

Honours
Dinamo Brest
Belarusian Super Cup winner: 2020

Ordabasy
Kazakhstan Cup winner: 2022

References

External links 
 
 

1996 births
Living people
Belarusian footballers
Association football forwards
Belarusian expatriate footballers
Expatriate footballers in Kazakhstan
FC Minsk players
FC Energetik-BGU Minsk players
FC Dynamo Brest players
FC Rukh Brest players
FC Ordabasy players